"So Nice" is a hip-hop song by New Zealand rapper Scribe. Featuring singer Ladi 6, the song was released as a double A-side with "Dreaming".

Chart performance
"Dreaming"/"So Nice" debuted on the New Zealand Singles Chart at number forty-eight, rising to the top spot five weeks later. The song spent one week at number one, and slipped out of the chart after a total of twenty-one weeks.

Track listing
 "Dreaming"
 "So Nice" (radio edit) [featuring Ladi 6]
 "Dreaming" (instrumental)
 "So Nice" (instrumental)
 "So Nice" (a cappella) [featuring Ladi 6]

Credits
Chris Chetland – mixing
Chris Macro – recording
Chip Matthews - bass
P-Money – mixing, production
Source:Discogs

References

Scribe (rapper) songs
2004 singles
2003 songs
Songs written by P-Money